Pendle is a local government district and borough of Lancashire, England. It adjoins the Lancashire boroughs of Burnley and Ribble Valley, the North Yorkshire district of Craven and the West Yorkshire boroughs of Calderdale and Bradford.

Early history

The name Pendle comes from the Cumbric word 'Pen' meaning hill (or head), a reference to Pendle Hill. Hence the name of the modern district derives from the prominent landmark at the west of the district, which already in the Middle Ages gave its name to the royal forest which spread to its east. Pendle Forest is still the name of a significant rural part of the district, though it has long ago ceased being a forest.

The ancient lordship of Pendle Forest has been under the Honour of Clitheroe since medieval times, and a title continues to be held by a modern version, the Barons Clitheroe.

Witch trials
The area is closely associated with the trials of the Pendle witches, among the most notorious such trials in English history.

Creation of the modern district
The current district with this name was created in 1974 as a result of local government reorganisation from the former Municipal Boroughs of Nelson and Colne, the former urban districts of Barnoldswick, Barrowford, Brierfield, Earby and Trawden, and from parts of Burnley Rural District and Skipton Rural District.

The Barnoldswick, Earby and Skipton parts are historically in the West Riding of Yorkshire. They are today referred to collectively as West Craven.

Neighbouring districts

Politics

MP
The Pendle constituency is represented in Parliament by the Conservative Member of Parliament, Andrew Stephenson, since 2010. Since its creation in 1983 its boundaries have been coterminous with those of the borough, however the constituency boundaries were redrawn in 1997 due to local government boundary changes in the 1980s.

Borough

Elections to the borough council are held in three out of every four years, with one third of the seats on the council being elected at each election. Following a review of the ward boundaries, the total number of Councillors was reduced in 2021 from 49 to 33. Since the election in 2021, the Conservative Party have had overall control of the council and, as of the election of 2021, the council is composed of the following councillors:-

In 2001 changes occurred which established 20 wards in the borough and set the number of councillors to 49.

Brian Cookson OBE retired in March 2013 from his position as Executive Director for Regeneration, a post he had held for nine years, in parallel (after 2007) with that of President of British Cycling. Subsequently becoming the President of the Union Cycliste Internationale (UCI), the world governing body for sports cycling.

In June 2017, a Conservative councilor, Rosemary Carroll, was suspended after sending a racist post on social media comparing Asians to dogs. This controversy expanded after the local elections in 2018, when the councilor was readmitted into the Conservative Party, allowing the Conservative party to gain a majority on the council. The Pendle Labour party accused the Pendle Conservative Party of condoning racism after the reinstatement. The Shadow Minister for Women and Equalities, Dawn Butler, called upon the Conservative Party Chairman, Brandon Lewis, to issue a statement saying that the councilor in question would not be part of the Conservative group on the council. This followed a statement from Lewis congratulating the Pendle Conservatives on winning a majority on the council.

In 2020 changes occurred which reduced the number of wards in the borough to 12 and the number of councillors to 33. The new wards created were: Barnoldswick, Barrowford & Pendleside, Boulsworth & Foulridge, Brierfield East & Clover Hill, Brierfield West & Reedley, Earby & Coates, Fence & Higham, Marsden & Southfield, Waterside & Horsfield, and Whitefield & Walverden.

Councillors

Economy
The three main employers in the borough are Rolls-Royce plc, Silentnight and the Daisy Group.

Places in Pendle

Freedom of the Borough
The following people and military units have received the Freedom of the Borough of Pendle.

Individuals
 Steven Burke : 3 August 2012.

Military Units
 The Queen's Lancashire Regiment: 2001.
 The Duke of Lancaster's Regiment: 1 July 2006.

References

 
Local government in the Borough of Pendle
Non-metropolitan districts of Lancashire
Boroughs in England